The Sand Martin Bridge (Chinese: 沙燕橋) is one of Hong Kong's bridges, part of the Sha Tin Rural Committee Road, named after the Shatin Martins, the first baseball team from Hong Kong to win a league. The Sand Martin bridge crosses the Shing Mun River, connecting Sha Tin Town Centre with Sha Tin Wai.

Construction
The Sand Martin Bridge connects to the Yuen Wo Road to the West and the Tai Chung Kiu Road to the East, connecting Sha Tin Town Centre and Lek Yuen to Sha Tin Wai. The bridge has a 4-lane dual carriageway with pedestrian walkways and cycling tracks, bounded by aluminum vehicular parapets and pedestrian fences.

Naming
The Sand Martin Bridge is named after the Shatin Martins Little League Team, after their victory in the 1983 Hong Kong Little League Open.

The Hong Kong movie Weeds on Fire, about the Shatin Martins, featured shots of the Sand Martin bridge.

References

 Bridges in Hong Kong